Major is a genus of flies in the family Dolichopodidae, endemic to Hawaii. It contains only one species, Major minor. It is part of the Eurynogaster complex of genera. The generic name is derived from the Latin major ("large"), referring to the extremely large tarsal claws of M. minor.

References 

Hydrophorinae
Dolichopodidae genera
Monotypic Brachycera genera
Insects of Hawaii
Endemic fauna of Hawaii
Taxa named by Octave Parent
Insects described in 1938